Exsiccata (Latin, gen. -ae, plur. -ae) is a work with "published, uniform, numbered set[s] of preserved specimens distributed with printed labels". Typically, exsiccatae refer to numbered collections of dried herbarium specimens respectively preserved biological samples published in several duplicate sets with a common theme/ title like Lichenes Helvetici (see figure). Exsiccatae are regarded as scientific contributions of the editor(s) with characteristics from the library world (published booklets of scientific literature, with authors/ editors, titles, often published as serials in formats with fascicles) and features from the herbarium world (uniform and numbered collections of duplicate herbarium specimens). Exsiccatae works represent a special method of scholarly communication. The text in the printed matters/published booklets is basically a list of labels (schedae) with informations on each single numbered exsiccatal unit. Extensions of the concept occur.

There are several comprehensive bibliographies and treatments on exsiccatae devoted to algae, bryophytes and lichens, lichens and fungi. A printed bibliography on works devoted to vascular plants is missing.

Early history

Exsiccatae are also known under the terms exsiccatal series, exsiccata(e) series, exsiccata(e) works, exsiccatae collections, sometimes exsiccati, exsiccate. Furthermore, the feminine noun term "exsiccata" (Latin, gen. -ae, plur. -ae) for exsiccata series is often not clearly distinguished from the neuter noun "exsiccatum" (Latin, gen. -i, plur. -a) which is used in general for a dried herbarium specimen. There exists also the Latin adjective "exsiccatus, -a, -um" meaning "dried" which is often part of a Latin title of an exsiccata, e.g. Lichenes exsiccati.

The oldest series known as an exsiccata is that of the German naturalist and pharmacist  called Herbarium vivum recens collectum... It was distributed in 1732. The plant material and text information is for the education of physician, pharmacists and teachers. 
With this goal, the system of exsiccatae is originated from herbarium books with images of plants and fungi, such as the Herbaria viva distributed in the 16th and 17th century, but now contained dried and pressed plant material. Series with scholarly and scientific focus followed few years later. One of that kind of series was published by the Swiss botanist Jakob Friedrich Ehrhart, a pupil of Carl Linnaeus, with the title Plantae cryptogamae Linn., quas in locis earum natalibus collegit et exsiccavit Fridericus Ehrhart. The first fascicle was delivered in 1785. As one of the first Jakob Friedrich Ehrhart promoted the selling of dried plants with several series, among others Arbores, frutices et suffrutices Linnaei quas in usum dendrophilorum collegit et exsiccavit Fr. Ehrhart and Calamariae, Gramina et Tripetaloideae Linnaei, quas in usum botanicophilorum collegit et exsiccavit Fr. Ehrhart.

The majority of the 2,200 known exsiccatae appeared in the 19th century. They are often specialised by a single organism group or geographical region. Two examples: 
Alexander Braun, Gottlob Ludwig Rabenhorst and Ernst Stizenberger have distributed Die Characeen Europa's in getrockneten Exemplaren, unter Mitwirkung mehrerer Freunde der Botanik, gesammelt und herausgegeben von Prof. A. Braun, L. Rabenhorst und E. Stizenberger in 1878 and Thomas Drummond published Musci Americani; or, specimens of the mosses collected in British North America, and chiefly among the Rocky Mountains, during the Second Land Arctic Expedition under the command of Captain Franklin, R.N. by Thomas Drummond, Assistant Naturalist ... in 1828.

Some series are devoted to organisms of economical or medicinal relevance, and thus of interest for pharmacists, plant pathologists, veterinarians, people working in horticulture, agriculture and forestry. Felix von Thümen published some exsiccatal series of this kind, e.g., Herbarium mycologicum oeconomicum.

Relevance in science

Exsiccatae are well-known reference systems in collection-based life science and biodiversity research. Especially in early, large and widely distributed series like the Fungi Rhenani of Karl Wilhelm Gottlieb Leopold Fuckel, many taxonomic type specimens are among the 2,700 numbered specimen units, now labelled as isotypes or lectotypes.

In 2001, a web portal with underlying database called "IndExs" was published with the goal of gathering and providing bibliographic information on all types of exsiccatae and exsiccata-like series. Currently more than 2,200 series with more than 1,300 editors are known. The editors are often well known as taxonomists. In the case that they published exsiccatae, the series are explicitly cited in Frans Stafleu and Richard Sumner Cowan's standard work Taxonomic Literature: A Selective Guide to Botanical Publications and Collections, with Dates, Commentaries, and Types (7 volumes) and in the 8 volumes of the supplement series with the first 6 co-authored by Erik Albert Mennega. How many issues (= sets) of an exsiccata is published and distributed is often unknown. In large institutional herbaria (see List of herbaria), the exsiccatae are often not kept in their original sets, but each single numbered specimen unit is inserted in the general collections and filed under the current taxon name, e.g. in M and in HUH (FH).

ICBN/ ICN articles and exsiccatae 

In the 19th century with mid of 20th century, exsiccatae played an important role in botany, mycology and binomial nomenclature. A lot of taxa were described with diagnosis in exsiccatae or exsiccatal-like specimen series using printed labels and schedae booklets for effective publication of the names, see for example Iris camillae described by Alexander Alfonsovich Grossheim in the schedae of Plantae orientales exsiccatae. These printed matters are often so-called grey literature. In the Vienna rules (1906) of the ICBN, now International Code of Nomenclature for algae, fungi, and plants (ICN), exsiccatae and their printed matters were explicitly mentioned in the context of valid publication (Article 37). With 1953 (under the Stockholm Code) the printed matters accompanying exsiccatae must be distributed independently of the exsiccatae for effective publication (see, e.g., Vienna Code 2006, Article 30.4). The recent code (Shenzhen Code 2018) does only mention exsiccatae explicitly but gives two exsiccatae as examples for effective publication under Article 30.8, Note 2. This correlates with the minor role that current exsiccatae play today with around 70 series running.

Herbarium digitization initiatives

Approximately 10 million of the 350 million botanical specimens in the major herbaria belong to the 2,200 widely distributed exsiccatae and exsiccata-like series. The specimens are either included in the general collections of the major herbaria or kept there as separate fascicles (see Index Herbariorum). Thus, the series are explicitly addressed by joint advanced digitization projects of biodiversity collections like iDigBio. As a result, most of the iDigBio web portals have a section for accessing specimens of exsiccatae, like the portal of the Consortium of Midwest Herbaria.

Approaches to generate virtual herbaria are optimizing their label data capture with linking the specimen text information to standard abbreviations of the exsiccata series following (online) bibliographies and example label images for disambiguation purposes. Citizen science approaches for herbarium label digitization have instructions about how to recognize exsiccatae and how to mobilize this information in a structured manner. An example is the guideline of the BGBM Herbonauten.. In general, the collections management systems used at major herbaria are able to handle data on exsiccata series and single exsiccata specimens.

Similar as iDigBio the concept for complete digitization of German herbaria is including the mobilisation of this structured historical information using a standard reference list of editors, titles, abbreviations, publication dates and number ranges. This procedure will facilitate the discovery of duplicate exsiccata specimens in the various herbaria and avoid multiple typing of the same text information. The mobilisation of this data is regarded as an example for creating synergies between institutional herbaria during the digitization process.

Exsiccata-like series 

Ideally, exsiccatae comprise dried plant or fungus material as a result of plant collecting, have a descriptive title, one or more editors (or alternatively an editing organisation), printed labels and the single dried specimens have printed schedae with numbers and are distributed in sets. Over time, with the changing goals in the wide field of organismic botany and mycology there were deviations in all aspects. There are exsiccata-like series distributing preserved natural objects other than dried herbarium material. Examples are glass slides with microorganisms, see Diatomacearum species typicae edited by Hamilton Lanphere Smith, and slides of wood, see American Woods edited by Romeyn Beck Hough.

Especially within the 19th century a number of exsiccata-like series and specimen collections which superficially resemble exsiccatae are known: some are without descriptive titles (instead they may have an organization as header), some without mentioned editors, others with labels that are in parts handwritten, and series without sequential numbers as well as series whose sets are not uniform. 

This century saw the increase of the trade and the exchange with plant material: More than 100 societies for plant exchange purposes, mostly with non-commercial goals, were founded, so-called plant exchange organizations, in German Pflanzentauschorganisationen.  They were busy announcing new material in scientific journals like Flora (Regensburg). Few of them had business models for selling exsiccatae and exsiccatae-like series. An example is the early Unio Itineraria, a society, which financially supported the scientific voyages of Georg Wilhelm Schimper and distributed series with printed labels like Schimper, Unio Itineraria 1835, and others. 

Some modern definitions of the term exsiccata reflect the purpose of sale and subscription in delivering exsiccatae, e.g. that in A Grammatical Dictionary of Botanical Latin. The recipients and buyers were private plant collectors, as well as learned societies and institutional herbaria. For more than two decades (1908-1932) there existed the journal Herbarium. Organ zur Förderung des Austausches wissenschaftlicher Exsiccatensammlungen Band I + II, no. 1-86  published by Theodor Oswald Weigel, Leipzig, who organised the sale of exsiccatae and exsiccata-like series in a professional manner.

Some series do not fulfill all of the ideal criteria for being an exsiccata and might be better named duplicate series. They may, for instance, lack a descriptive title, have in parts handwritten labels with handwritten numbers, have distributed sets that are not uniform, duplicate specimens that are not numbered and schedae which are not published as independent schedae work. One of the plant exchange associations that existed more than a hundred years was the Société Française pour l’échange des plantes vasculaires, from 1911 to 2015. This organisation developed a network of plant collectors worldwide, elaborated guidelines for plant collectors and distributed a number of exsiccata-like series, partly numbered, with printed labelsand distributed booklets. The last exsiccata-like series edited by the Société pour l’Échange des Plantes vasculaires de l’Europe et du Bassin méditerranéen et correspondant finally distributed 20,000 specimen units of vascular plants and started in 1947.

The term exsiccata is also widened for describing botanical art works bounded as books, which contain decorative assortments of pressed plant specimens mounted to the pages, usually arranged in a theme.

References

Herbaria
Botany
Lichenology
Bryology
Mycology
History of mycology
Phycology
History of botany
Botanical literature